"Some Girls Are Bigger Than Others" is a song by the English rock band the Smiths. Recorded in autumn 1985, it was first released on their third studio album The Queen Is Dead in June 1986. It was also released as a single in Germany.

Background
As with every original recording by the Smiths, the music of "Some Girls Are Bigger Than Others" was composed by Johnny Marr and the lyrics were written by Morrissey. The recording was given a distinctive intro by engineer Stephen Street, who increased the reverb on the drums, faded the track in then out again, and took the reverb back off when reintroducing the song: "A bit like opening a door, closing it, then opening it again and walking in". The lyric paraphrases Johnny Tillotson's 1962 single "Send Me the Pillow That You Dream On", and broadly references the 1964 comedy Carry On Cleo ("Oooh, I say"). The phrase "the Dole Age" refers to Unemployment Benefit, nicknamed the "dole"; in the year of the song's release, 1986, 3 million people in the United Kingdom were unemployed.

Reception
In the mainstream British music press, "Some Girls Are Bigger Than Others" was mentioned in the context of The Queen Is Dead. In the NME, Adrian Thrills wrote, "As an album with humour never far from its surface, it is fitting that The Queen Is Dead should conclude with the clipped, undulating frivolity of 'Some Girls Are Bigger Than Others', a hypnotic musical travelogue that verges on the transcendental [...] Again, the Morrissey muse and Marr's musical setting collide marvellously, the track illuminated by some lovely slide guitar from the latter. It would have made another classic Smiths single".

Andy Strickland in Record Mirror said, "Morrissey and Marr still can't quite get it together all the time, 'Never Had No One Ever' and 'Some Girls Are Bigger Than Others' bearing all the hallmarks of the familiar Smiths filler, where music and words hardly embrace," while Nick Kent wrote, "'Vicar in a Tutu' and 'Some Girls Are Bigger Than Others', sensibly restrained arrangement-wise, may well be lesser songs but, constructed within their rightful limitations, sound absolutely stunning".

In Simon Goddard's track-by-track book Songs That Saved Your Life, Johnny Marr describes the song as "a beautiful piece of music", while the author writes, "Possessing one of his most alluring guitar melodies [...] if Marr's tune was heaven-sent, then it seemed very nearly blasphemous of Morrissey to christen it 'Some Girls Are Bigger Than Others' and bestow it with its notoriously frivolous lyric".

Live version
"Some Girls Are Bigger Than Others" was performed live only once: at the final concert by the Smiths, at Brixton Academy, London, on 12 December 1986. The performance, which included a verse ("On the shop floor, there's a calendar, as obvious as snow, as if we didn't know") not used in the studio version, was recorded and later featured as a B-side on the 12" and cassette edition of the "I Started Something I Couldn't Finish" single in November 1987.

Single release
In Germany, "Some Girls Are Bigger Than Others" was released as a single in slightly edited form, on 7" and 12" vinyl, with artwork modified from the cover used for "Ask".

Sleeve image
The single cover depicts actress Yootha Joyce in a still from the 1965 film Catch Us If You Can.  The same photograph had been used on the 1986 single "Ask".

Etchings on vinyl

7": ROCK AND ROLLING TO THE TOP/A PRECISE DIAMOND CUT

12": NO GIRL LIKE JAGUAR ROSE/BUSY TRAIN TO THE LOKOMOTION

Track listings

In popular culture
 1995: Martin Newell covered the song on The Off White Album, produced by Louis Philippe.
 1996: Supergrass covered the song on tribute album The Smiths Is Dead.
 1997: Slovak musician Karol Mikloš recorded the composition as "Some Boys Are Bigger Than Others" for his debut set The Same Mist Here.
 2005: The song title was used for a musical based around the music of Morrissey & Marr.
 2007: German band Brockdorff Klang Labor covered the song for their debut album Mädchenmusik.
 2009: The Irish cellist and singer Janie Price who lives in Copenhagen/Denmark covered the song as the band Bird for her first album "A Girl and a Cello" by exchanging "girls" and "mothers" with "boys" and "fathers".

References

The Smiths songs
1986 singles
Songs written by Morrissey
Songs written by Johnny Marr